Tonnachau Mountain (also variously spelled Tonachau and Tonaachaw), is a mountain on Weno Island in Chuuk State of the Federated States of Micronesia. Tonnachau is, however, a prominent landmark rising above Chuuk International Airport. The mountain also has an important place in Chuukese culture and prehistory, with archaeologically significant prehistoric middens and fortifications on its summit ridge which date back as far as 4,000 BCE. Chuukese tradition states that its hero Soukachou built a fort on Tonachau when he arrived from Kosrae and established rule over the lagoon. The mountain also has extensive remains of mainly Japanese fortifications erected during World War II.

The mountain was listed on the United States National Register of Historic Places on September 30, 1976, a time when Chuuk was part of the US-administered Trust Territory of the Pacific Islands.

References

National Register of Historic Places in the Federated States of Micronesia
Mountains of the Federated States of Micronesia
Weno